Kontogouris is a Greek surname. Notable people with the surname include:

Andreas Kontogouris (died 1824), Greek diplomat and a revolutionary leader
Aristomenis Kontogouris (1841-1904), former mayor of Patras
Nikolaos Kontogouris (1878–1913), Greek politician and army officer

Greek-language surnames
Surnames